The Quakers Act 1695 was an Act of the Parliament of England which allowed Quakers to substitute an affirmation where the law previously required an oath. The Act did not apply to the oaths required when giving evidence in a criminal case or to serve on a jury or to hold any office of profit from the Crown. It allowed legal proceedings to be taken against Quakers before a justice of the peace for refusing to pay tithes if the amount claimed did not exceed £10.

The Act would have expired in seven years but, in 1702, Parliament extended it for another eleven years by the Affirmation by Quakers Act 1701. In 1715, it was made permanent and applied also to Scotland.

Repeal
The Act, except sections 3 and 4, was repealed by the Statute Law Revision Act 1867. The remaining sections were repealed by the Statute Law (Repeals) Act 1969.

Notes

External links
 Chapter XXXIV. Rot. Parl. 7 & 8 Gul. III. p.9. n.3. History of Parliament Trust

Acts of the Parliament of England
1695 in law
1695 in England
Quakerism in England
Oaths